Tectaria is a genus of fern in the family Tectariaceae, according to the Pteridophyte Phylogeny Group classification of 2016 (PPG I). Halberd fern is a common name for species in this genus.

Species 
, the Checklist of Ferns and Lycophytes of the World recognized the following species and hybrids:

Tectaria acerifolia R.C.Moran
Tectaria acrocarpa (Ching) Christenh.
Tectaria adenophora Copel.
Tectaria aenigma C.W.Chen & C.J.Rothf.
Tectaria aequatoriensis (Hieron.) C.Chr.
Tectaria amblyotis (Baker) C.Chr.
Tectaria × amesiana A.A.Eaton =  T. coriandrifolia × T. lobata
Tectaria amphiblestra R.M.Tryon & A.F.Tryon
Tectaria andersonii Holttum
Tectaria angelicifolia (Schum.) Copel.
Tectaria angulata (Willd.) Copel.
Tectaria antioquiana (Baker) C.Chr.
Tectaria aspidioides (C.Presl) Copel.
Tectaria athyrioides (Baker) C.Chr.
Tectaria athyriosora M.G.Price
Tectaria atropurpurea A.R.Sm.
Tectaria aurita (Sw.) S.Chandra
Tectaria balansae (C.Chr.) C.Chr.
Tectaria barberi (Hook.) Copel.
Tectaria barteri (J.Sm.) C.Chr.
Tectaria beccariana (Ces.) C.Chr.
Tectaria blumeana (Regel) C.V.Morton
Tectaria borneensis S.Y.Dong
Tectaria brachiata (Zoll. & Moritz) C.V.Morton
Tectaria brevilobata Holttum
Tectaria brooksii Copel.
Tectaria × bulbifera Jermy & T.G.Walker
Tectaria calcarea (J.Sm.) Copel.
Tectaria caluffii Riv.-Giró & C.Sánchez
Tectaria camerooniana (Hook.) Alston
Tectaria ceramensis (Holttum) S.Y.Dong
Tectaria × chaconiana A.Rojas
Tectaria chattagramica (C.B.Clarke) Ching
Tectaria cherasica Holttum
Tectaria chimborazensis (C.Chr.) C.Chr.
Tectaria chinensis (Ching & Chu H.Wang) Christenh.
Tectaria christovalensis (C.Chr.) Alston
Tectaria cicutaria (L.) Copel.
Tectaria coadunata (Wall. ex Hook. & Grev.) C.Chr.
Tectaria colaniae (Tardieu & C.Chr.) comb. ined.
Tectaria confluens (F.Muell. ex Baker) Pic. Serm.
Tectaria corallorum Holttum
Tectaria coriandrifolia (Sw.) Underw.
Tectaria craspedocarpa Copel.
Tectaria crenata Cav.
Tectaria croftii Holttum
Tectaria curtisii Holttum
Tectaria × cynthiae L.D.Gómez = T. nicaraguensis × T. nicotianifolia
Tectaria danfuensis Holttum
Tectaria darienensis A.Rojas
Tectaria decurrens (C.Presl) Copel.
Tectaria degeneri Copel.
Tectaria dissecta (G.Forst.) Lellinger
Tectaria dolichosora Copel.
Tectaria dressleri A.Rojas
Tectaria durvillei (Bory) Holttum
Tectaria ebenina (C.Chr.) Ching
Tectaria elata (Holttum) Li Bing Zhang & X.Zhang
Tectaria estremerana Proctor & A.M.Evans
Tectaria exauriculata Holttum
Tectaria faberiana Rojas
Tectaria fauriei Tagawa
Tectaria fernandensis (Baker) C.Chr.
Tectaria ferruginea (Mett.) Copel.
Tectaria filisquamata Holttum
Tectaria fimbriata (Willd.) Proctor & Lourteig
Tectaria fissa (Kunze) Holttum
Tectaria fuscipes (Wall.) C.Chr.
Tectaria gaudichaudii (Mett.) Maxon
Tectaria gemmifera (Fée) Alston
Tectaria gigantea (Blume) Copel.
Tectaria godeffroyi (Luerss.) Copel.
Tectaria griffithii (Baker) C.Chr.
Tectaria grossedentata Ching & Chu H.Wang
Tectaria guachana Rusea
Tectaria gurupahensis (C.Chr. ex Kjellb. & C.Chr.) comb. ined.
Tectaria harlandii (Hook.) C.M.Kuo
Tectaria hennipmanii (Tagawa & K.Iwats.) S.Y.Dong
Tectaria heracleifolia (Willd.) Underw.
Tectaria herpetocaulos Holttum
Tectaria heterocarpa (Bedd.) C.V.Morton
Tectaria hilocarpa (Fée) M.G.Price
Tectaria hollrungii (Kuhn) Li Bing Zhang & X.Zhang
Tectaria holttumii C.Chr.
Tectaria × hongkongensis S.Y.Dong
Tectaria hookeri Brownlie
Tectaria humbertiana Tardieu
Tectaria hymenodes (Mett. ex Kuhn) J.W.Moore
Tectaria hymenophylla (Bedd.) Holttum
Tectaria impressa (Fée) Holttum
Tectaria incisa Cav.
Tectaria incisa Cav. f. vivipara (Jenman) C.V.Morton
Tectaria ingens (Atk. ex C.B.Clarke) Holttum
Tectaria inopinata Holttum
Tectaria isomorpha Holttum
Tectaria jacobsii Holttum
Tectaria jardini (Mett.) E.D.Br.
Tectaria jermyi S.Y.Dong
Tectaria jimenezii M.Kessler & A.R.Sm.
Tectaria johannis-winkleri (C.Chr.) C.Chr.
Tectaria kalimantanensis S.Y.Dong
Tectaria katoi (Holttum) C.W.Chen & C.J.Rothf.
Tectaria keckii (Luerss.) C.Chr.
Tectaria kehdingiana (Kuhn ex Luerss.) M.G.Price
Tectaria kingii Copel.
Tectaria kouniensis Brownlie
Tectaria kusukusensis (Hayata) Lellinger
Tectaria labrusca (Hook.) Copel.
Tectaria lacei Holttum
Tectaria lacinifolia A.Rojas & D.Sanín
Tectaria laotica Tardieu & C.Chr.
Tectaria latifolia (G.Forst.) Copel.
Tectaria lawrenceana (Moore) C.Chr.
Tectaria laxa (Copel.) M.G.Price
Tectaria leptophylla (C.H.Wright) Ching
Tectaria lifuensis (E.Fourn.) C.Chr.
Tectaria lizarzaburui (Sodiro) C.Chr.
Tectaria lobbii (Hook.) Copel.
Tectaria lobulata (Blume) K.Iwats. & M.Kato
Tectaria lombokensis Holttum
Tectaria longipinnata A.Rojas
Tectaria luchunensis S.K.Wu
Tectaria macleanii (Copel.) S.Y.Dong
Tectaria macrosora (Baker) C.Chr.
Tectaria macrota Holttum
Tectaria madagascarica Tardieu
Tectaria magnifica (Bonap.) C.Chr.
Tectaria manilensis (C.Presl) Holttum
Tectaria marchionica E.D.Br.
Tectaria media Ching
Tectaria melanocauloides M.Kato
Tectaria melanocaulos (Blume) Copel.
Tectaria melanorachis (Baker) Copel.
Tectaria membranacea (Hook.) Fraser-Jenk. & Kholia
Tectaria mesodon (Copel.) M.G.Price
Tectaria mexicana (Fée) C.V.Morton
Tectaria × michleriana (D.C.Eaton) Lellinger
Tectaria microchlamys Holttum
Tectaria microlepis Holttum
Tectaria microsora A.R.Sm.
Tectaria mindanaensis (Holttum) C.W.Chen & C.J.Rothf.
Tectaria minuta Copel.
Tectaria moorei (Hook.) C.Chr.
Tectaria moranii Li Bing Zhang & G.D.Tang
Tectaria morlae (Sodiro) C.Chr.
Tectaria morsei (Baker) P.J.Edwards ex S.Y.Dong
Tectaria moussetii Holttum
Tectaria multicaudata (C.B.Clarke) Ching
Tectaria murilloana A.Rojas
Tectaria murrayi (Baker) C.Chr.
Tectaria nabirensis Holttum
Tectaria nausoriensis Brownlie
Tectaria nayarii Mazumdar
Tectaria nebulosa (Baker) C.Chr.
Tectaria nicaraguensis (E.Fourn.) C.Chr.
Tectaria nitens Copel.
Tectaria novoguineensis (Rosenst.) C.Chr.
Tectaria orbicularis Jermy & T.G.Walker
Tectaria organensis C.Chr.
Tectaria palmata (Mett.) Copel.
Tectaria panamensis (Hook.) R.M.Tryon & A.F.Tryon
Tectaria pandurifolia (C.Chr.) C.Chr.
Tectaria paradoxa (Fée) Sledge
Tectaria pardalina A.Rojas
Tectaria pascoensis A.Rojas
Tectaria pedata (Desv.) R.M.Tryon & A.F.Tryon
Tectaria pentagonalis (Bonap.) comb. ined.
Tectaria perdimorpha Holttum
Tectaria phaeocaulis (Rosenst.) C.Chr.
Tectaria phanomensis S.Linds.
Tectaria pica (L. fil.) C.Chr.
Tectaria pilosa (Fée) R.C.Moran
Tectaria pinnata (C.Chr.) R.M.Tryon & A.F.Tryon
Tectaria pleiosora (Alderw.) C.Chr.
Tectaria pleiotoma (Baker) C.Chr.
Tectaria pluriseriata (Holttum) S.Y.Dong
Tectaria poeppigii (C.Presl) C.Chr.
Tectaria poilanei Tardieu
Tectaria polymorpha (Wall. ex Hook.) Copel.
Tectaria prolifera (Hook. & Grev.)) R.M.Tryon & A.F.Tryon
Tectaria pseudosiifolia Fraser-Jenk. & Wangdi
Tectaria pseudosinuata Brownlie
Tectaria psomiocarpa S.Y.Dong
Tectaria × pteropus-minor (Bedd.) Fraser-Jenk.
Tectaria pubens R.C.Moran
Tectaria puberula (Desv.) C.Chr.
Tectaria pubescens Copel.
Tectaria pulchra (Copel.) C.W.Chen & C.J.Rothf.
Tectaria quinquefida (Baker) Ching
Tectaria quitensis (C.Chr.) C.Chr.
Tectaria ramosii (Copel.) Holttum
Tectaria rara (Alderw.) C.Chr.
Tectaria remotipinna Ching & Chu H.Wang
Tectaria repanda (Willd.) Holttum
Tectaria rheophytica Holttum
Tectaria rigida Holttum
Tectaria rivalis (Mett. ex Kuhn) Maxon
Tectaria rockii C.Chr.
Tectaria rufescens Holttum
Tectaria rufovillosa (Rosenst.) C.Chr.
Tectaria sabahensis C.W.Chen & C.J.Rothf.
Tectaria sagenioides (Mett.) Christenh.
Tectaria samariana S.Y.Dong
Tectaria schmutzii Holttum
Tectaria schultzei (Brause) C.Chr.
Tectaria seemannii (E.Fourn.) Copel.
Tectaria semibipinnata (Wall. ex Hook.) Copel.
Tectaria semipinnata (Roxb.) C.V.Morton
Tectaria seramensis M.Kato
Tectaria setulosa (Baker) Holttum
Tectaria shahidaniana Rusea
Tectaria siifolia (Willd.) Copel.
Tectaria simonsii (Baker) Ching
Tectaria singaporeana (Wall. ex Hook. & Grev.) Copel.
Tectaria sinuata (Labill.) C.Chr.
Tectaria solomonensis Holttum
Tectaria squamipes Holttum
Tectaria squamosa Riv.-Giró & C.Sánchez
Tectaria stalactica M.G.Price
Tectaria stearnsii Maxon
Tectaria stenosemioides (Alderw.) C.Chr.
Tectaria subaequalis (Rosenst.) Copel.
Tectaria subcaudata (Alderw.) C.Chr.
Tectaria subconfluens (Bedd.) Ching
Tectaria subcordata Holttum
Tectaria subdigitata (Baker) Copel.
Tectaria subdimorpha A.Rojas
Tectaria subebenea (Christ) C.Chr.
Tectaria subfuscipes (Tagawa) C.M.Kuo
Tectaria subglabrata (Holttum) S.Y.Dong
Tectaria subrepanda (Baker) C.Chr.
Tectaria subsageniacea (Christ) Christenh.
Tectaria subtriloba Holttum
Tectaria subtriphylla (Hook. & Arn.) Copel.
Tectaria sulitii Copel.
Tectaria suluensis Holttum
Tectaria sumatrana (C.Chr.) C.Chr.
Tectaria tabonensis M.G.Price
Tectaria taccifolia (Fée) M.G.Price
Tectaria tahitensis Maxon
Tectaria tenerifrons (Hook.) Ching
Tectaria tenuifolia (Mett.) Maxon
Tectaria teratocarpa (Alderw.) C.Chr.
Tectaria teysmanniana (Baker) S.Y.Dong
Tectaria thwaitesii (Bedd.) Ching
Tectaria torrisiana Shaffer-Fehre
Tectaria transiens (C.V.Morton) A.R.Sm.
Tectaria translucens Holttum
Tectaria trichodes (C.V.Morton) A.R.Sm.
Tectaria trichotoma (Fée) Tagawa
Tectaria tricuspis (Bedd.) Copel.
Tectaria trifida (Fée) M.G.Price
Tectaria trifoliata (L.) Cav.
Tectaria triglossa Tardieu & C.Chr.
Tectaria triloba (Sodiro) C.Chr.
Tectaria trimenii (Bedd.) C.Chr.
Tectaria trinitensis Maxon
Tectaria tripartita (Baker) Copel.
Tectaria vasta (Blume) Copel.
Tectaria vieillardii (E.Fourn.) C.Chr.
Tectaria villosa Holttum
Tectaria vitiensis Brownlie
Tectaria waterlotii (Tardieu) J.P.Roux
Tectaria weberi Copel.
Tectaria wenzelii (Copel.) S.Y.Dong
Tectaria wightii (C.B.Clarke) Ching
Tectaria wigmanii (Racib.) S.Y.Dong
Tectaria zeilanica (Houtt.) Sledge
Tectaria zippelii S.Y.Dong
Tectaria zollingeri (Kurz) Holttum

References

 
Fern genera
Taxonomy articles created by Polbot
Taxa named by Antonio José Cavanilles